Elizabeth and After is a novel by Matt Cohen, first published in 1999 by Knopf Canada. His final novel, it won the Governor General's Award for English-language fiction just a few weeks before Cohen's death.

Plot summary
The story is about the lives of a few people living in a small town north of Kingston, Ontario.  Carl McKelvey, a "white trash male" as he describes himself, returns to the town after a three-year absence in the hope that he can live with his daughter again, and maybe even renew his relationship with his ex-wife, Chrissy.  He carries deep in his heart his guilt of having driven his car into a tree, killing his mother, Elizabeth, many years earlier.

Elizabeth's sudden death ended not only an unhappy marriage she had with William McKelvey, a failed farmer, but also a secret relationship she had with Adam Goldsmith, Carl's real father.  Elizabeth might have felt that the uncultured McKelvey ruined her life, or she might be too frightened to ruin her life herself by leaving him.  In either case, her life has affected McKelvey, Adam and Carl so deeply that her influence is still felt eleven years later.

When Carl is attacked by Fred (Chrissy's boyfriend), Adam, even though reserved and gentle-natured, decides to do something for his son.  Adam takes Fred in his car and drives him into the same tree that Elizabeth's car crashed into eleven years earlier.  Both Adam and Fred are killed instantly.  Carl learns about his relationship with Adam in a letter Adam left for him.

External links
 Elizabeth and After weaves a twisted tale

1999 Canadian novels
Novels by Matt Cohen
Novels set in Ontario
Governor General's Award-winning fiction books
Knopf Canada books